The 2014 United States House of Representatives election in Alaska was held on November 4, 2014, to elect the U.S. representative from Alaska's at-large congressional district, who will represent the state of Alaska in the 114th United States Congress. The election coincided with the elections of a Class II U.S. Senator and the Governor of Alaska, as well as other elections to the United States Senate in other states and elections to the United States House of Representatives and various state and local elections.

Incumbent Republican U.S. Representative Don Young ran for re-election to a twenty-second term in office. He won the Republican primary and then defeated Democratic attorney Forrest Dunbar and Libertarian business professor Jim McDermott in the general election. Young was the only statewide official in Alaska who was re-elected in 2014, as Republican Governor Sean Parnell and Democratic U.S. Senator Mark Begich were both defeated by their respective challengers.

Republican primary

Candidates

Declared
 John Cox, retired naval officer and candidate for the seat in 2010 and 2012
 David Dohner, write-in candidate for the seat in 2012
 David Seaward, former Mayor of Seward
 Don Young, incumbent U.S. Representative

Primary results

Democratic–Libertarian–Independence primary
Candidates from the Alaska Democratic Party, Alaska Libertarian Party and Alaskan Independence Party appear on the same ballot, with the highest-placed candidate from each party receiving that party's nomination.

Democratic candidates

Declared
 Forrest Dunbar, attorney
 Frank Vondersaar, attorney, engineer and perennial candidate

Withdrew
 Matt Moore, businessman and candidate for the seat in 2012

Declined
 Scott McAdams, former Mayor of Sitka and nominee for the U.S. Senate in 2010

Libertarian candidates

Declared
 Jim McDermott, business professor and nominee for the seat in 2012

Primary results

General election

Polling

Results

References

External links
John Cox
Forrest Dunbar
Jim McDermott
Frank Vondersaar
Don Young
Division of Elections at Alaska Government
Alaska U.S. House at OurCampaigns.com
United States House of Representatives elections in Alaska, 2014 at Ballotpedia
Campaign contributions at OpenSecrets
Outside spending at the Sunlight Foundation

United States House of Representatives
Alaska
2014